Balara may refer to:

Balhara (disambiguation)
Balara, Nepal
Balara, a village in Bangladesh
Balaran, Sikar - Balara, a small town in Laxmangarh tehsil of Sikar district in Rajasthan, India. Location" Latitude: 26° 18' 0 N Longitude: 74° 4' 60 E.
Balara, a village in Pali district in Rajasthanjaitaran , India